Nipania is a village in Begusarai district, Bihar, India. It is also home to a military camp.

Barauni Junction is the nearest railway station.

Villages in Begusarai district